Integrated Operations in the High North (IOHN, IO High North or IO in the High North) is a unique collaboration project that during a four-year period starting May 2008 is working on designing, implementing and testing a Digital Platform for what in the Upstream Oil and Gas Industry is called the next or second generation of Integrated Operations. 
The work on the Digital platform is focussed on capture, transfer and integration of Real-time data from the remote production installations to the decision makers. A risk evaluation across the whole chain is also included. The platform is based on open standards and enables a higher degree of interoperability. Requirements for the digital platform come from use cases defined within the Drilling and Completion, Reservoir and Production and Operations and Maintenance domains. The platform will subsequently be demonstrated through pilots within these three domains. 

This new platform is considered an important enabler for safe and sustainable operations in remote, vulnerable and hazardous areas such as the High North, but the technology is clearly also applicable in more general applications.

The IOHN project consortium consists of 23 participants, including operators, service providers, software vendors, technology providers, research institutions and universities. In addition, the Norwegian Defence Force is working with the project to resolve common infrastructural and interoperability challenges.

The project is managed by Det Norske Veritas (DNV). Nils Sandsmark was the project manager during the initiation and start-up phase. Frédéric Verhelst took over as project manager from the beginning of 2009.

Financing comes from the participants and the Research Council of Norway (RCN) for parts of the project (GOICT
and AutoConRig).

Participants 
The consortium consists of the following 22 participants (in alphabetical order):

See also 
 Integrated Operations
 Semantic Web
 ISO 15926 aka Oil and Gas Ontology, an enabler for the next or second generation of Integrated Operations by integrating data across disciplines and business domains.
 Petroleum exploration in the Arctic
 POSC Caesar Association, the custodian of ISO 15926, the Oil and Gas Ontology.

References

External links 
 Integrated Operations in the High North website
 W3C workshop on Semantic Web in Oil and Gas industry, Houston, December 9–10, 2008. Position papers from several participants in IOHN.
 Semantic Days 2009 conference, Stavanger, May 18–20, 2009. One session is devoted to IOHN.
 IO 09 Science and Practice conference, Trondheim, September 29–30, 2009. One session is devoted to IOHN.
 Integrated Operations in the High North—mid term report, Oil IT Journal, March 2010.

Petroleum organizations
Petroleum engineering
Semantic Web
Knowledge engineering
Information science
Ontology (information science)
Knowledge representation